The 1956 All-Ireland Senior Hurling Championship was the 70th staging of the All-Ireland hurling championship since its establishment by the Gaelic Athletic Association in 1887. The championship began on 22 April 1956 and ended on 23 September 1956.

Wexford were the defending champions, and retained their All-Ireland crown following a 2-14 to 2-8 defeat of Cork.

Teams

A total of thirteen teams contested the championship, a reduction of one on the previous championship. Wicklow withdrew and did not field a team in the Leinster Senior Hurling Championship.

Team summaries

Results

Leinster Senior Hurling Championship

First round

Quarter-finals

Semi-finals

Final

Munster Senior Hurling Championship

Quarter-final

Semi-finals

Final

All-Ireland Senior Hurling Championship

Semi-final

Final

Championship statistics

Top scorers

Top scorers overall

Top scorers in a single game

Scoring

Widest winning margin: 19 points 
Wexford 8-9 - 2-2 Laois  (Leinster semi-final, 10 June 1956)
Most goals in a match: 15 
Westmeath 9-6 - 6-1 Meath (Leinster first round, 29 April 1956)
Most points in a match: 22 
Wexford 2-14 - 2-8 Cork (All-Ireland final, 23 September 1956)
Most goals by one team in a match: 9 
Westmeath 9-6 - 6-1 Meath (Leinster first round, 29 April 1956)
Most goals scored by a losing team: 6 
Westmeath 9-6 - 6-1 Meath (Leinster first round, 29 April 1956)
Most points scored by a losing team: 12 
Cork 5-9 - 2-12 Waterford (Munster quarter-final, 10 June 1956)

Miscellaneous

 Wexford won a third Leinster title in-a-row. It remains the only time in their history that they went undefeated in the provincial championship for three successive campaigns.
 An outbreak of polio in Cork and the fear of a spread of the disease to Dublin due to an influx of Cork supporters lead to the postponement of the All-Ireland final until 23 September 1956.
 The attendance of 83,096 at the All-Ireland final remains an all-time record.
 Wexford retained the All-Ireland title for the only time in their history. The 2-14 to 2-8 victory remained their only championship defeat of Cork until July 2016 when they did it again in the round 2 Qualifiers. (Cork–Wexford hurling rivalry)

Sources

 Corry, Eoghan, The GAA Book of Lists (Hodder Headline Ireland, 2005).
 Donegan, Des, The Complete Handbook of Gaelic Games (DBA Publications Limited, 2005).
 Horgan, Tim, Christy Ring: Hurling's Greatest (The Collins Press, 2007).
 Nolan, Pat, Flashbacks: A Half Century of Cork Hurling (The Collins Press, 2000).
 Sweeney, Éamonn, Munster Hurling Legends (The O'Brien Press, 2002).

External links
 1956 All-Ireland Hurling Championship results

References

1956
All-Ireland Senior Hurling Championship